Jefferson Township is the name of 4 townships in the U.S. state of South Dakota:

 Jefferson Township, McCook County, South Dakota
 Jefferson Township, Moody County, South Dakota
 Jefferson Township, Spink County, South Dakota
 Jefferson Township, Union County, South Dakota

See also 
 Jefferson Township (disambiguation)

South Dakota township disambiguation pages